Pechersk School International (PSI) is a school located in Kyiv, Ukraine. It provides education ranging from the early childhood-level, to the end of the IB diploma-programme. PSI is a dynamic, diverse, not-for-profit international school community.

History
The school was established in 1995 by parents keen to improve the quality of education for their children. PSI is the only school in Ukraine to be accredited in three International Baccalaureate (IB) programmes. These include the Primary Years Programme (PYP), the Middle Years Programme (MYP), and the Diploma Programme (DP). The IB diploma is recognised by more than 2337 universities in over 74 countries.

Accreditations & Memberships 
PSI has been accredited by the New England Association of Schools & Colleges (NEASC).  It is a current member of the Council of International Schools (CIS), European Council of International School (ECIS), Central and Eastern Schools Association (CEESA) and receives support from the US Department of State Office of Overseas Schools. Pechersk School International is the only international school in Ukraine with approval from the Ukrainian School of External Studies to offer an additional general education programme accepted by the Ministry of Education of Ukraine. Students study a combination of classes offered by Ukrainian programme teachers and IB classes which are accepted by the Ukrainian Ministry of Education and Science.

War in Ukraine 
Due to the war in Ukraine, the 2022 – 2023 academic year will find PSI providing in-person instruction to its students at a satellite campus in Warsaw, Poland as well as online instruction for its students living abroad. PSI will resume operations at its campus in Kyiv one the situation will allow its safe re-opening.

Satellite campus in Warsaw 
In August 2022, PSI is going to open a new temporary satellite campus in Warsaw in partnership with the American School of Warsaw (ASW). This will provide many opportunities for students to interact with ASW students, and to benefit from the ASW co-curricular programmes, service learning opportunities, student events, such as dances etc that PSI has always run in the past. The IB Diploma Programme students, in addition to face-to-face learning, will also have enhanced access to Pamoja courses, a recognised course provider by the International Baccalaureate, meaning that a rich variety of IB DP courses will be available to them.

Alumni
Most of its alumni go on to study in foreign universities. 33 students from the class of 2022, had university acceptances across 6 countries.  Alumni of Pechersk School International go on to study at world's most elite universities, including Harvard University, Yale University, NYU and NYUAD, Yale-NUS College, Stanford University, King's College London, University of Edinburgh, and others. There is also an established alumni association, which holds reunions for former students and staff members both face-to-face and virtually. In 2019, reunions were held in New York and London.

References

External links

 Pechersk School International website

International Baccalaureate schools in Ukraine
Schools in Kyiv
International schools in Ukraine
Educational institutions established in 1995
1995 establishments in Ukraine